The New Mexico Senate is the upper house of the New Mexico State Legislature. The Senate consists of 42 members, with each senator representing an equal number of single-member constituent districts across the state. All senatorial districts are divided to contain a population on average of 43,300 state residents. Members of the Senate are elected to four-year terms without term limits.

The Senate convenes at the New Mexico State Capitol building in Santa Fe.

Composition
The makeup of the Senate for sessions from 2009–present is:

Leadership

Current members

Past composition of the Senate

See also
 New Mexico House of Representatives

Notes

References

External links
 Official government website
 Project Vote Smart – State Senate of New Mexico

State upper houses in the United States
Government of New Mexico